The Main Military Medical Directorate,. also known as Military Medical Directorate, a successor of Soviet Military Medical  Directorate, is the specialist medical corps in the Russian Ministry of defense, it was part of the Soviet Armed Forces. Now it is part of the Russian Armed Forces which provides medical services to all Army personnel and their families, in war and in peace.

The headquarters is located in the Main Building of the Ministry of Defense at Znamenka 19, Moscow, Russia

History

First Military corps in Russia were formed as Medical Expedition in the Russian Army (Медицинская экспедиция при Военного Министерства России) in 1805.

Since 1867 it was renamed to Main Medical Department. In 1909 it was renamed to Main Military Sanitary Directorate (Главное военно-санитарное управление).

During Soviet regime the Military Medical Department changed its name many times: In 1924 it became the Military Sanitary Directorate of the Red Army (ВСУ РККА). In 1936: Sanitary Directorate, and during World War II, in 1941 the department was called again as the Main Military Sanitary Directorate (ГВСУ).

In 1946 the Directorate carried the current name: Main Military Medical Directorate of the Soviet Armed Forces (ГВМУ ВС СССР).

In 1960 it simply was called as the Military Medical Directorate (or the Center for Military Medical Directorate)

After the dissolution of the USSR, the Military medicine was subordinate to the Armed Forced of the Russian Federation in 1992 and became Main Military Medical Directorate of the Russian Military (ГВМУ ВС РФ).

Structure
More than 100,000 medical specialists are working in the Military medicine system, including 23,000 doctors. The Military services built with 70 military medical organizations, with about 4 million workers.

Missions
preservation and strengthening the health of the military personnel;
improving accessibility and quality of healthcare for all contingents have the right to legislate on health care at the expense of the Russian Defense Ministry;
strengthening the material-technical base of military medical units and institutions;
comprehensive re-modern medical equipment of health centers of military units, the sanitary and epidemiologic institutions and military hospitals;
participation in the implementation of federal target programs;
integration with civilian health institutions in order to preserve and promote the health of family members of military personnel and veterans of the Armed Forces;
institutionalization of warning systems, expertise, monitoring and correction of the health for young people at all stages, starting with the pre-conscription period
tightening of the barrier function when calling up citizens for military service in order to prevent patients in the Armed Forces;
close cooperation of military control bodies with legislative and executive authorities, both at the federal and at the regional level on issues of manning the Armed Forces healthy replenishment;
sustainable sanitary and epidemiological welfare of the personnel and the deployment of troops (forces) areas on the basis of strict compliance with the statutory provisions governing the conditions of life and military life, trouble-free operation of all life-support systems of military camps;
prevention of the most pressing for the army and navy of diseases, especially infectious diseases, mental health, drug addiction, alcoholism, diseases of the skin and subcutaneous tissue injuries;
formation of the personnel of the Army and Navy active life position in matters of health protection;
priority financing of expenditure on military health care, including at the expense of extra-budgetary sources;
creation of conditions for the guaranteed medical support attachments contingents.

Commanders

See also
Kirov Military Medical Academy (founded in 1798)
Army Medical Department (United States)
Royal Army Medical Corps (United Kingdom)
Combat medic
Military academies in Russia#Kuybyshev Military Medical Academy

References

External links
Official Homepage

Military medical organizations
Ministry of Defence (Russia)
Military medicine in Russia
Military medicine in the Soviet Union